Božo Đumić (born 7 January 1992) is a Serbian professional basketball player for Hercegovac Gajdobra of the Second Basketball League of Serbia.

He arrived to Partizan from Vojvodina Srbijagas as a replacement for Đorđe Gagić in January 2015. In 2018, Đumić played for Ferroviario Beira of the Mozambican League.
Currently play for Hercegovac Gajdobra of the Second Basketball League of Serbia.

References

External links
 Božo Đumić at aba-liga.com
 Božo Đumić at fiba.com

1992 births
Living people
ABA League players
KK FMP players
KK Hercegovac Gajdobra players
KK Partizan players
KK Vojvodina Srbijagas players
KK Napredak Kruševac players
KK Novi Sad players
OKK Sloboda Tuzla players
OKK Novi Pazar players
OKK Borac players
People from Vrbas, Serbia
Serbian expatriate basketball people in Bosnia and Herzegovina
Serbian expatriate basketball people in Mozambique
Serbian expatriate basketball people in North Macedonia
Serbian expatriate basketball people in Slovenia
Serbian men's basketball players
Centers (basketball)
Power forwards (basketball)
Helios Suns players